The 2007 Tour de Vineyards was held from 1 January to 4 January 2007 in New Zealand. The male race was won by Heath Blackgrove, who also won two of the four stages, and the female race by Serena Sheridan who won three of the four stages.

Men's stage summary

Men's top 10 overall

Women's stage summary

Women's top 10 overall

References
 Full results of the tour

Tour de Vineyards
Tour de Vineyards
Tour de Vineyards
Tour de Vineyards
Tour de Vineyards
Tour de Vineyards
2007 in women's road cycling